Birmingham City Football Club, an association football club based in Birmingham, England, was founded in 1875 as Small Heath Alliance. For the first thirteen years of their existence, there was no league football, so matches were arranged on an ad hoc basis, supplemented by cup competitions organised at local and national level. Small Heath first entered the FA Cup in the 1881–82 season, and won their first trophy, the Walsall Cup, the following season. During the 1880s, they played between 20 and 30 matches each season.

In 1888, the club became a limited company under the name of Small Heath F.C. Ltd, and joined the Combination, a league set up to provide organised football for those clubs not invited to join the Football League which was to start the same year. However, the Combination was not well organised and folded in April 1889 with many fixtures still outstanding. Small Heath were founder members of the Football Alliance in 1889–90, and three years later were elected to the newly formed Second Division of the Football League. They topped the table in their first season, failing to win promotion via the test match system then in operation, but reached the top flight for the first time in 1894. They were renamed Birmingham in 1905, finally becoming Birmingham City in 1943.

The club's official history rated 1955–56 as their best season to date. The newly promoted club achieved their highest ever finishing position of sixth in the First Division, reached the 1956 FA Cup Final, and became the first English club side to participate in European competition when they played their opening game in the group stages of the Inter-Cities Fairs Cup. Their only major trophy is the League Cup, which they won in 1963 and 2011; they reached the FA Cup final twice and the final of the Inter-Cities Fairs Cup twice. During the 1990s, they twice won the Associate Members' Cup, a competition open to clubs in the third and fourth tiers of English football.

As of the end of the 2021–22 season, the club's first team had spent 57 seasons in the top division of English football, 58 in the second, and 4 in the third. The table details their achievements in first-team competitions, and records their top goalscorer and average home league attendance, for each completed season since their first appearance in the Birmingham Senior Cup in 1878–79.

Key

Key to league record:
P – Played
W – Games won
D – Games drawn
L – Games lost
F – Goals for
A – Goals against
Pts – Points
Pos – Final position

Key to colours and symbols:

Key to divisions:
Comb – The Combination
All – Football Alliance
United – United League
Div 1 – Football League First Division
Div 2 – Football League Second Division
Div 3 – Football League Third Division
Champ – EFL Championship
Prem – Premier League

Key to rounds:
Prelim – Preliminary round
Group –  Group stage
QR3 – Third qualifying round
QR4 – Fourth qualifying round, etc.
IntR – Intermediate round (between qualifying rounds and rounds proper)
R1 – First round
R2 – Second round, etc.
QF – Quarter-final
SF – Semi-final
P3rd – Third place
F – Finalists
W – Winners
DQ – Disqualified
DNE – Did not enter

Details of abandoned competitions – The Combination in 1888–89 and the 1939–40 Football League – are shown in italics and appropriately footnoted.

Seasons

Notes

References

Sources
 
 
 

Seasons
 
English football club seasons